The Freehold Regional High School District is a public regional school district established in 1953, that serves students in ninth through twelfth grades from eight communities in western Monmouth County, New Jersey, United States. The district, with six high schools, is the largest regional high school district in the state, as measured by enrollment. The district serves students from Colts Neck Township, Englishtown, Farmingdale, Freehold Borough, Freehold Township, Howell Township, Manalapan Township and Marlboro Township.

Each of the six high schools is located in their respective communities: Howell High School in Howell Township, Manalapan High School in Manalapan Township, Marlboro High School in Marlboro Township, Colts Neck High School in Colts Neck Township, Freehold Township High School in Freehold Township & Freehold High School in Freehold Borough, although school boundaries do not match municipal boundaries.

As of the 2020–21 school year, the district, comprised of six schools, had an enrollment of 10,519 students and 687.5 classroom teachers (on an FTE basis), for a student–teacher ratio of 15.3:1.

The district has been accredited by the Middle States Association of Colleges and Schools Commission on Elementary and Secondary Schools since 2016.

The district is classified by the New Jersey Department of Education as being in District Factor Group "GH", the third-highest of eight groupings. District Factor Groups organize districts statewide to allow comparison by common socioeconomic characteristics of the local districts. From lowest socioeconomic status to highest, the categories are A, B, CD, DE, FG, GH, I and J.

The Freehold Regional High School District is home to specialized Magnet Programs. The Magnet Programs provide opportunities for students to engage in academic study related to their individual interests. The 12 Magnet Programs focus on particular topics, ranging from humanities and law to medical sciences and engineering. By joining one of these unique learning communities within the six high schools, students have access to advanced level courses, including Advanced Placement and college level classes. Students also engage in real-world activities with recognized experts in fields related to each program. Students in these programs distinguish themselves on the national and global stages. They earn millions of dollars in scholarships, place at the highest levels in competitions, and attend the nation’s best colleges, universities, and trade schools.

Freehold Township High School and Howell High School have both been named IB World Schools. They are two of only 17 schools in New Jersey to offer the International Baccalaureate (IB) Diploma Programme (DP). Every effort is made to keep special education students in the district; a variety of in-class support, resource center, and self-contained programs are conducted to educate those in need of special education.

History
The school district came into being as a result of a referendum vote on October 6, 1953, in which voters in each of the seven districts united to form the district. The referendum allocated $690,000 (equivalent to $ in ) to be used to purchase Freehold High School by the regional district from the Freehold Borough Board of Education.

A referendum for a second high school was passed in March 1962 by a 2-1 margin. The board of education confirmed the name Southern Freehold Regional High School in November 1962 and allocated $2.7 million (equivalent to $ million in ) for construction of a building on a  site to handle an enrollment of up to 1,300 students. Ground was broken in March 1963, with construction set to start a month later and a target completion date of May 1964. The school opened in September 1968, though construction delays meant that the school was not fully complete. When it opened, the Southern Freehold Regional High School attendance zone included all of Farmingdale and Howell Township along with the southern portion of Freehold Township, with all other students remaining at Freehold Regional High School.

With the opening of the Marlboro High School for the 1968-69 school year, attendance zones were realigned so that Freehold High School (with 1,500 students in grades 9-12) served all students from Freehold Borough and parts of Freehold Township; Howell High School (with 1,500 students in 9-12) served all of Farmingdale and Howell Township, and parts of Freehold Township and Marlboro Township; while Marlboro High School (with 1,100 students in grades 9-11) served all of Colts Neck Township, Englishtown and Marlboro Township, along with parts of Manalapan Township. Constructed at a cost of $3.4 million (equivalent to $ million in ), Marlboro High School opened in late October 1968.

Freehold Township High School and Manalapan High School, the district's fourth and fifth facilities, were constructed with identical designs. Groundbreaking for both schools took place in August 1969 and the two schools opened in September 1971, having been completed at a combined cost of $10.4 million (equivalent to $ million in ). Manalapan High School opened with an enrollment of 900 students from Englishtown and Manalapan Township, who had previously attended Marlboro High School. Freehold High School was closed for a $300,000 renovation project during the 1971-72 school year, during which it operated with 1,600 students using the new building that had been completed for Freehold Township High School.

In September 1986, after a decade-long effort, voters approved a referendum for the creation of a high school in Colts Neck by a 58%-42% margin, with Colts Neck Township residents providing much of the margin for passage. By 1988, the costs of construction of the new high school had jumped by millions of dollars, exceeding the amount available from the referendum to cover the costs, leading to further delays. In February 1993, a judge ruled that the district had to move forward with construction of the new high school and could not put forth a referendum to undo the 1986 vote and the New Jersey Supreme Court refused to hear the case. Construction began in August 1996, with expectations to have the building open in September 1998 to handle 750 incoming students, with an eventual capacity for 1,300. Colts Neck High School opened in September 1998 as the sixth high school in the system, with 380 students in ninth and tenth grades.

High schools
Attendance at each of the district's six schools is based on where the student lives in relation to the district's high schools.  While many students attend the school in their hometown, others attend a school located outside their own municipality. In order to balance enrollment, district lines are redrawn for the six schools to address issues with overcrowding and spending in regards to transportation. Schools in the district (with 2020–21 enrollment data from the National Center for Education Statistics) with their attendance zones for incoming students are:
 Colts Neck High School - 1,316 students from Colts Neck Township (all), Howell (part) and Marlboro (part).
Dr. Brian Donahue, Principal
 Freehold High School - 1,343 students from Freehold (all) and Freehold Township (part).
Dr. Lavetta Ross, Principal
 Freehold Township High School - 2,003 students from Freehold Township (part), Howell (part), Manalapan (part).
Dr. Alicia Scelso, Principal
 Howell High School - 2,094 students from Farmingdale (all) and Howell (part).
Jeremy Braverman, Principal
 Manalapan High School - 1,828 students from Englishtown (all) and Manalapan (part).
Shawn Currie, Principal
 Marlboro High School - 1,794 students from Marlboro (part).
Dr. David Bleakley, Principal

Effective for entering Freshman, students from each of the municipalities are assigned to attend the specified schools:
Colts Neck to Colts Neck H.S.
Englishtown to Manalapan H.S.
Farmingdale to Howell H.S.
Freehold Borough to Freehold Borough H.S.
Freehold Township to Freehold Borough H.S. or Freehold Township H.S.
Howell to Colts Neck H.S., Freehold Township H.S. or Howell H.S.
Manalapan to Freehold Township H.S. or Manalapan H.S.
Marlboro to Colts Neck H.S. or Marlboro H.S.

Magnet programs
Students may apply to attend one of the district's six specialized learning centers, each listed at one of the district's high schools.

 Science and Engineering Learning Center at Manalapan High School
 Medical Sciences Learning Center at Freehold High School
 Business Administration Learning Center at Marlboro High School
 Scholars' Center for the Humanities - Howell High School
 Global Studies Learning Center at Freehold Township High School
 Center for Law and Public Service at Colts Neck High School

Naval JROTC  - Colts Neck High School
 Law Enforcement and Public Safety - Manalapan High School
 Culinary Arts and Hospitality Management - Freehold High School
 Computer Science - Freehold High School
 Fine and Performing Arts - Howell High School
 Animal and Botanical Sciences - Freehold Township High School

Administration
Core members of the district's administration are:
Charles B. Sampson, Superintendent
Sean Boyce, Business Administrator / Board Secretary

Sampson was approved as the district's new superintendent at the board meeting on February 15, 2011, and assumed the superintendent duties on June 7, 2011.

Board of education
The district's board of education, comprised of nine members from each of the constituent districts, sets policy and oversees the fiscal and educational operation of the district through its administration. As a Type II school district, the board's trustees are elected directly by voters to serve three-year terms of office on a staggered basis, with three seats up for election each year held (since 2012) as part of the November general election. The board appoints a superintendent to oversee the district's day-to-day operations and a business administrator to supervise the business functions of the district. Each member is allocated a fraction of a vote that totals to nine points.

Members of the board of education are:
Peter Bruno (President) - Howell Township (1.0 vote)
Marc Parisi (Vice President) - Howell Township (1.0 vote)
Diana Cappiello - Englishtown Borough (0.5 vote)
Debra Fanelli - Colts Neck (0.9 vote)
Elizabeth Higley - Freehold Township (1.4 vote)
Kathie Lavin - Farmingdale Borough (0.5 vote)
Michael Messinger - Marlboro Township (1.4 vote)
Heshy Moses - Freehold Borough (0.9 vote)
Adam Weiss - Manalapan Township (1.4 vote)

Notable alumni
 Bonnie Bernstein (Howell HS), ESPN Sports Reporter.
 Scott Conover (Freehold HS), former Detroit Lions offensive tackle (1991–96)
 David DeJesus (Manalapan HS), MLB player on the Chicago Cubs
 Karl Girolamo, has a recurring role on the daytime soap As the World Turns as Kevin Davis.
 Dan Klecko (Marlboro HS), NFL football player and son of Joe Klecko.
 Danny Lewis (Freehold HS), former NFL player
 Craig Mazin (Medical Sciences Learning Center at Freehold HS, class of 1988), screenwriter, director and producer.
 Jim Nantz (Marlboro HS), sports commentator for CBS Sports.
 Tom Pelphrey (Howell HS), actor, Guiding Light.
 Kal Penn (Freehold Twp. and Howell HS), actor, Harold & Kumar Go to White Castle, The Namesake.
 Tim Perry (Freehold HS), former NBA player
 Amy Polumbo (Fine and Performing Arts Academy at Howell HS, class of 2003), Miss New Jersey, 2007.
 Darrell Reid (Freehold HS), Indianapolis Colts Defensive End
 Michael "The Situation" Sorrentino (Manalapan HS), of Jersey Shore.
 Gregg and Evan Spiridellis (Marlboro HS) - two brothers who launched the internet media company JibJab.
 Bruce Springsteen (Freehold HS), musician.
 Jade Yorker (Manalapan HS), actor.

References

External links
Freehold Regional High School District Official site

School Data for the Freehold Regional High School District, National Center for Education Statistics

1953 establishments in New Jersey
School districts established in 1953
Colts Neck Township, New Jersey
Englishtown, New Jersey
Farmingdale, New Jersey
Freehold Borough, New Jersey
Freehold Township, New Jersey
Howell Township, New Jersey
Manalapan Township, New Jersey
Marlboro Township, New Jersey
New Jersey District Factor Group GH
School districts in Monmouth County, New Jersey